Manolescu's Memoirs (German: Manolescus Memoiren) is a 1920 German silent film directed by Richard Oswald and starring Conrad Veidt, Erna Morena and Lilli Lohrer.

The film's sets were designed by the art director Hans Dreier.

Cast
 Conrad Veidt as Manolescu  
 Erna Morena as Diane von Montignan  
 Lilli Lohrer as Leonie, Portierstochter  
 Hedda Vernon as Cäcilie  
 Hermann Wlach as Rudolf Berg, Oberkellner  
 Alfred Kuehne as der alte Manolescu  
 Clementine Plessner as Mutter Manolescu  
 Kathe Oswald as Inge  
 Rudolf Forster as Alfons, deren Verlobter  
 Adele Sandrock as Gräfin Anastasia Worutzky  
 Robert Scholtz as Geheimpolizist Schröder  
 Preben J. Rist as Herr im Pyjama

See also
 Manolescu (1929) 
 Manolescu, Prince of Thieves (1933)

References

Bibliography
 Eric Rentschler. German Film & Literature. Routledge, 2013.

External links

1920 films
1920s biographical films
1920s crime comedy films
German biographical films
Films of the Weimar Republic
Films directed by Richard Oswald
German silent feature films
German crime comedy films
German heist films
Films about con artists
Biographical films about criminals
Films set in the 1890s
Films set in the 1900s
German black-and-white films
1920 comedy films
Silent crime comedy films
1920s German films
1920s German-language films